The 39th Division (39. Division) was a unit of the Prussian/German Army. It was formed on April 1, 1899, and was headquartered in Colmar (now in France).  The division was subordinated in peacetime initially to the XIV Army Corps (XIV. Armeekorps) and then to the XV Army Corps (XV. Armeekorps). The division was disbanded in 1919 during the demobilization of the German Army after World War I.

Recruitment

The division was a mixed unit: its Prussian elements, although designated Upper Alsatian, were mainly raised in the more densely populated Rhine Province and the Province of Westphalia, as the Alsatian German population was insufficient to support all the units stationed there.  The 126th Infantry Regiment was from the Kingdom of Württemberg.  The 66th Field Artillery was from the Grand Duchy of Baden.  The 14th Jäger Battalion, attached on mobilization from the XIV Army Corps, was from the Grand Duchy of Mecklenburg-Schwerin.

Combat chronicle

The division began World War I fighting in the Battle of the Frontiers, and then fought in the Race to the Sea, culminating in the Battle of the Yser.  The division remained on the Yser front until January 1916, when it was transferred to the vicinity of Verdun.  It then fought in the Battle of Verdun and also saw action in the later phases of the Battle of the Somme.  It spent the first half of 1917 in the trenches of the Champagne and served in the Second Battle of the Aisne, also known as the Third Battle of Champagne (and to the Germans as the Double Battle Aisne-Champagne).  It then moved to Flanders and saw action in the Battle of Passchendaele.  In 1918, it fought in the German spring offensive and remained in the Flanders region during the subsequent Allied offensives.  Allied intelligence rated the division as second class.

Pre-World War I organization

The organization of the 39th Division in 1914, shortly before the outbreak of World War I, was as follows:

61. Infanterie-Brigade
Infanterie-Regiment Nr. 126 Großherzog Friedrich von Baden (8. Württembergisches)
1. Unter-Elsässisches Infanterie-Regiment Nr. 132
82. Infanterie-Brigade
2. Ober-Elsässiches Infanterie-Regiment Nr. 171
3. Ober-Elsässiches Infanterie-Regiment Nr. 172
39. Kavallerie-Brigade
Kurmärkisches Dragoner-Regiment Nr. 14
Jäger-Regiment zu Pferde Nr. 3
39. Feldartillerie-Brigade
4. Badisches Feldartillerie-Regiment Nr. 66
3. Ober-Elsässisches Feldartillerie-Regiment Nr. 80

Order of battle on mobilization

On mobilization in August 1914 at the beginning of World War I, most divisional cavalry, including brigade headquarters, was withdrawn to form cavalry divisions or split up among divisions as reconnaissance units.  Divisions received engineer companies and other support units from their higher headquarters.  The 39th Division was redesignated the 39th Infantry Division. Its initial wartime organization was as follows:

61. Infanterie-Brigade
Infanterie-Regiment Nr. 126 Großherzog Friedrich von Baden (8. Württembergisches)
1. Unter-Elsässisches Infanterie-Regiment Nr. 132
82. Infanterie-Brigade
2. Ober-Elsässiches Infanterie-Regiment Nr. 171
3. Ober-Elsässiches Infanterie-Regiment Nr. 172
Großherzoglich Mecklenburgisches Jäger-Bataillon Nr. 14
Kurmärkisches Dragoner-Regiment Nr. 14
39. Feldartillerie-Brigade
4. Badisches Feldartillerie-Regiment Nr. 66
3. Ober-Elsässisches Feldartillerie-Regiment Nr. 80
2.Kompanie/1. Elsässisches Pionier-Bataillon Nr. 15
3.Kompanie/1. Elsässisches Pionier-Bataillon Nr. 15

Late World War I organization

Divisions underwent many changes during the war, with regiments moving from division to division, and some being destroyed and rebuilt.  During the war, most divisions became triangular - one infantry brigade with three infantry regiments rather than two infantry brigades of two regiments (a "square division"). An artillery commander replaced the artillery brigade headquarters, the cavalry was further reduced, the engineer contingent was increased, and a divisional signals command was created. The 39th Infantry Division's order of battle on February 20, 1918, was as follows:

61. Infanterie-Brigade
Infanterie-Regiment Nr. 126 Großherzog Friedrich von Baden (8. Württembergisches)
1. Unter-Elsässisches Infanterie-Regiment Nr. 132
3. Ober-Elsässiches Infanterie-Regiment Nr. 172
Maschinengewehr-Scharfschützen-Abteilung Nr. 19
1. Eskadron/Reserve-Husaren-Regiment Nr. 8
Artillerie-Kommandeur 39
3. Ober-Elsässisches Feldartillerie-Regiment Nr. 80
Fußartillerie-Bataillon Nr. 406
Stab Pionier-Bataillon Nr. 136:
2.Kompanie/1. Elsässisches Pionier-Bataillon Nr. 15
3.Kompanie/1. Elsässisches Pionier-Bataillon Nr. 15
Minenwerfer-Kompanie Nr. 39
Divisions-Nachrichten-Kommandeur 39

References
 39. Infanterie-Division  (Chronik 1914/1918) - Der erste Weltkrieg
 Claus von Bredow, bearb., Historische Rang- und Stammliste des deutschen Heeres (1905)
 Hermann Cron et al., Ruhmeshalle unserer alten Armee (Berlin, 1935)
 Hermann Cron, Geschichte des deutschen Heeres im Weltkriege 1914-1918 (Berlin, 1937)
 Günter Wegner, Stellenbesetzung der deutschen Heere 1815-1939. (Biblio Verlag, Osnabrück, 1993), Bd. 1
 Histories of Two Hundred and Fifty-One Divisions of the German Army which Participated in the War (1914-1918), compiled from records of Intelligence section of the General Staff, American Expeditionary Forces, at General Headquarters, Chaumont, France 1919 (1920)

Notes

Infantry divisions of Germany in World War I
Military units and formations established in 1899
Military units and formations disestablished in 1919
1899 establishments in Germany